Macedonian anthem can refer to:

"Denes nad Makedonija" - the national anthem of North Macedonia
"Makedonia Ksakousti" - the (unofficial) regional anthem of Greek Macedonia